Pakistan University Grants Commission were a first-class cricket team, sponsored by the body that is now the Higher Education Commission of Pakistan, that played in the Patron's Trophy in 1990-91 and 1991-92.

In all they played 14 first-class matches, with two wins, nine losses and three draws. They finished seventh out of eight in 1990-91, winning two matches and losing five. In 1991-92 they finished last, with four losses and two draws. They also played a drawn first-class match against the touring England A team in 1990-91.

The captain in 1990-91 was Shahid Khan, and in 1991-92 it was Ahmed Munir. Mujahid Jamshed hit the only two centuries, with a highest of 149 against National Bank of Pakistan. Shahid Khan had the best bowling figures, 7 for 79 against Pakistan National Shipping Corporation.

The team also played 22 List A matches in the same two seasons, winning four and losing 18.

In 1990-91 they played all their first-class and List A matches at the Punjab University Old Campus Ground, Lahore. In 1991-92 they played no home matches.

Note: In Wisden Cricketers' Almanack the team was called “Combined Universities”.

Notable cricketers
 Ghulam Ali (cricketer)
 Aziz-ur-Rehman (cricketer, born 1966)
 Afzaal Haider
 Mujahid Jamshed
 Kamran Khan (Pakistani cricketer)
 Maqsood Rana

References

External links
Matches played by Pakistan University Grants Commission at CricketArchive

Pakistani first-class cricket teams
Former senior cricket clubs of Pakistan